Coles Creek is a creek in the states of Louisiana and Mississippi that is a tributary of the Mississippi River.  The Natchez Trace has a rest stop along Coles Creek.

See also
List of rivers of Mississippi

References

Rivers of Louisiana
Rivers of Mississippi
Tributaries of the Mississippi River